The Catholic Church in Bosnia and Herzegovina comprises mainly a Latin hierarchy, which is composed of 
 one ecclesiastical province, under the Metropolitan Archdiocese of Vrhbosna (Sarajevo), which has three Bosnian suffragan dioceses and is also the Metropolitan of the Diocese of Skopje in Macedonia.
 the exempt military Ordinariate for the armed forces of Bosnia and Hercegovina

It is also pastorally served by the (Croatian) sole Byzantine rite (Eastern Catholic) diocese of the Croatian (Greek) Catholic Church.

There is an Apostolic Nunciature (papal diplomatic representation at embassy level) to Bosnia and Herzegovina I the national capital Sarajevo, into which are also vested the Apostolic Nunciatures to Monaco and to Montenegro.

Current Latin Dioceses

Exempt, sui iuris 
 Military Ordinariate of Bosnia and Herzegovina (Vojni ordinarijat u Bosne i Hercegovine)

Ecclesiastical Province of Sarajevo 
 Metropolitan Archdiocese of Vrhbosna 
 Diocese of Banja Luka 
 Diocese of Mostar-Duvno
 Diocese of Trebinje-Mrkan

Eastern Catholics 
 The Croatian Catholic Eparchy of Križevci, named after its see in Croatia, also covers all Bosnia-Hercegvina (as well as Sovenia), being the only diocese of the Croatian Catholic Church sui iuris (Byzantine Rite in Croatian), yet is a suffragan of the Latin Metropolitan Archdiocese of Zagreb.

Defunct jurisdictions

Titular sees 
Ten Latin Titular bishoprics: Bela, Bistue, Chimæra, Cozyla, Horæa, Moglæna, Morosbisdus, Rhasus, Sarsenterum and Tzernicus.

Other Latin jurisdictions 
 Roman Catholic Diocese of Duvno

Other Eastern Catholic jurisdictions 
 Ruthenian Catholic Apostolic Administration of Bosnia-Hercegovina

Sources and external links 
 GCatholic.org - data for all sections.
 Catholic-Hierarchy entry.

Bosnia and Herzegovina
Catholic dioceses